An anal vibrator is a vibrator designed for sexual stimulation of the anus of both men and women. All anal vibrators have one common feature: they produce a vibrating effect in the rectum for pleasurable sensations.

Anal vibrators differ from other types of vibrators in that they have a flared base to prevent possible loss in the rectum. The average size of an anal vibrator is smaller than vibrators intended for vaginal penetration and may vary from 4-6 inches long and about 1 inch wide. As well as other vibrators designed for external and internal stimulation, anal vibrators are usually battery operated: the batteries may be inside the unit or connected by wire to a power pack.

Unlike anal dildos, such as butt plugs, anal probes and anal beads, vibrating anal toys may produce various stimulating effects: rotating, vibrating or pulsating, and can have different speed or vibration levels to regulate and adjust the vibrator to various sensations.

Types of anal vibrators
 Vibrating anal probes
Anal probes, with vibrating effect are smaller than usual butt plugs–about the size of a finger, which make them a very helpful anal toy for beginners. Anal probe vibrators may be narrower because their main function is to slide and vibrate.
 Vibrating butt plugs
Vibrating butt plugs are made to stay inside the anus to create fullness and vibrating stimulation at the same time. Their advantage is that they can be simply left in for anal stimulation during solo or partners' sex to receive multiple enhancements.
 Vibrating anal beads and balls
Vibrating beads and balls are a number of small beads or balls joined together through a long retrievable cord to a power control. They may not only be inserted and pulled out but also vibrate at different speeds.
 P-Spot Vibrator
P-Spot Vibrator are made in such a shape with curved heads that these facilitate the stimulation of P-spot.

See also
 Clitoral pump
 Clitoral vibrator
 Double penetration dildo
 G-spot vibrator
 Love egg
 Rabbit vibrator
 Strap-on dildo

Anal sex toys
Vibrators
Massage devices